Gümüşyaka (literally "silver side") is a Turkish place name that may refer to the following places in Turkey:

 Gümüşyaka, Elmalı, a village in the district of Elmalı, Antalya Province
 Gümüşyaka, Polatlı, a village in the district of Polatlı, Ankara Province

See also 

 Gümüş (disambiguation), "silver"